West Mountain may refer to:

 West Mountain (Albany County, New York), a mountain
 West Mountain (Hamilton County, New York), a mountain
 West Mountain (ski area), Queensbury, New York
 West Mountain, Connecticut, a census-designated place in Ridgefield, Connecticut
 West Mountain Historic District
 West Mountain (Utah County, Utah)
 West Mountain, Utah, a census-designated place 
 West Mountain, a spur peak of Smith Mountain (Taconic Mountains) in western Massachusetts

See also
 Mount West, Antarctica
 Mountain west (disambiguation)
 Westmont (disambiguation)
 Westmount (disambiguation)